James Richard Barnaby Haydon (born 2 November 1973 in Amersham, Buckinghamshire), is a British former motorcycle racer. He raced in 250cc and 500cc Grand Prix, MotoGP, British Superbike and the World Superbike Championship. He retired in 2008.

He now works in media, presenting shows and race commentating on ITV and British Eurosport for World Superbike Championship and British Superbike Championship coverage, and he covers some Moto GP races when the regular commentators are unavailable. He has worked for the BBC, Sky Sports, Motors TV, Al Jazeera and Radio 5 live and is seen as a rising talent within the media side of the sport. He is also the guest test rider for Britain's biggest motorcycle monthly –  Bike Magazine.


Biography
James got his passion for speed through his father David, a Doctor who loved fast cars and motorcycles. He bought James his first motorcycle aged eight which he would ride in his parents garden. He quickly moved into Motorcross and worked his way up into the top 40 in Britain in Schoolboy Motorcross. But instead of pursuing a career in that sport he swapped to road racing at 16 in 1990. He finished 2nd in the British 125 Ministock Championship in his first year. Also starting in Ministocks that season was Neil Hodgson who immediately became (and still is) a great friend of James'). James then moved straight into The British 125cc Championship in 1991 (grabbing a pole position, some top 10 finishes and also winning the EMRA 125cc Championship). He was then spotted by Ron Haslem for a ride on Team Great Britain in 1992 after a disappointing finish in the 1991 Superteen championship. He raced a Yamaha TZ250 and won his first British Championship race at Silverstone that same year.  The next season in 1993 he just missed out on winning the British 250cc Championship (which he had dominated) after the camera he was carrying for TV came loose and jammed his back wheel in the final race causing him to crash. The same season at 19 (having already won 4 British Championship 250cc races) he competed in the 1993 British 500cc Grand Prix, finishing 11th to become the youngest ever British points-scorer in a top-division World Championship race. He managed to finish well ahead of his mentor, the legendary Ron Haslam adding more prestige to his great performance. In 1994 he won his first British Superbike Championship race along with two more national 250cc victories that year.

For 1995 he then jumped straight into the top level 500cc world championship as a privateer (1995 for Harris and 1996 for WCM). He took some stunning top 10 results and impressed many with his speed on a privateer bike. He had offers to stay in G.P.'s but he decided to move to the WSBK in 1997. But this was with GIACO MOTO, a poorly run Team who struggled with finance and an old motorcycle. James quit after the bike broke down 14 times. His best result was a 9th-placed finish.

After three years in the World Championship for 1998 he returned home to the ultra competitive British Superbike championship. He surprised many with a podium in his first race before going on to have many years of success. He quickly became a crowd and sponsor favourite with his exciting all action style, never give up attitude and screen presence. He raced for Team Suzuki, Team Red Bull Ducati, Team Yamaha and Team Kawasaki. Never the luckiest rider many felt one of his best chances for the Championship came in 2000 for Ducati. Whilst leading the Championship a terrible mid season car accident (in which he was a passenger) damaged his neck and nerves badly. This caused him serious problems when racing and training and ruined his season. He twice finished 4th in the standings and was always one of the fastest riders, with multiple lap records and fastest laps throughout his BSB career. He won a total of 12 British Superbike Championship races and had over 30 podiums in the series.

In 2002 he joined Carl Fogarty's Foggy Petronas in the WSBK, developing the new bike for the first year. It proved unreliable with multiple blow ups, a lack of parts supply and other problems dogging it throughout the year. James had to leap from the motorcycle twice when it blew up and engulfed him in flames and fuel. One of the lowest points came when the gearbox locked up in Germany and caused a horrific accident (putting him out for the middle of the season). His high point was a best result of 7th in the world in Japan.

In 2004 he nearly retired after the mentally and physically draining previous season and started it without a ride. But his pedigree could not be ignored and he was soon called up to stand in at Virgin Mobile Yamaha in the British Superbike series. He immediately turned the Teams season around taking the bikes and Teams only win of the year and also putting it on the podium. Despite missing many rounds he beat all the other riders in the team and finished top Yamaha in Britain. It was also the only season in his career that he never crashed, not even in practice. At the end of the season he also raced in the last few MotoGP's ( World Championship) for Kenny Roberts Proton team. His best result an impressive 12th place in Qatar.

2004 had been such a good season that he signed a prestigious two-year deal for Airwaves Ducati (one of the top teams in Britain). He should have spent 2005 and 2006 on an Airwaves Ducati but an unlucky pre-season testing injury at Albacete saw Gregorio Lavilla take over his ride and then keeping it after a promising start (and eventually winning the championship on it). With no ride he became 'Super Sub' once again, filling in for various teams throughout 2005. Eventually ending up at Team Suzuki (after John Reynolds was injured). He immediately beat his new teammate (Scott Smart) and when the injured John Reynolds returned, the Team kept Haydon not Smart and he rewarded them with some strong results including a podium.

This was good enough for an offer to stay with the Team for 2006 alongside 2003 champion Shane Byrne. After a strong start at Oulton Park on identical bikes, James was made to run a different development bike to Byrne with a changed weight balance. He disliked the new bike immediately and blamed his sudden poor form and crashes on the change of machine. But with his ally the experienced Paul Denning (ex- Suzuki Team Manager) off in MotoGP and a new Team manager who had never worked in motorsport before, James struggled.  After a heavy crash at Mallory he missed round 6 through injury then returned at Snetterton for Round 7. In race 2 a serious brake problem at the end of the Revvit straight caused him to run off the track at high speed. Unable to slow properly he shot across the track and collided with Dean Thomas. This caused an unfortunate crash which left Thomas and Haydon injured. Both riders soon recovered although only Haydon returned to race that season. Afterwards the incident was reviewed by an RAC panel and Haydon was cleared of all responsibility when the data logging proved the problem had been completely outside his control.

For 2007 he returned to Virgin Yamaha alongside Tommy Hill in a Team he had excelled with in the past. But he parted company with the team stating that he had "lost confidence in the development Pirelli tyres they were forced to run and that showed in (his) riding. Lacking extra funds the Team said that there was no possibility of a testing programme to help (him) rebuild that confidence so it seemed impossible to continue". N.B. Virgin Yamaha were the only team in Britain to run the then new Pirelli tyres that year against the established and mighty Michelin and Dunlop. Later that year he signed as 'Super Sub' for Hawk Kawasaki and in his first race with them he beat his teammate and finished top Kawasaki. He continued that form for most of the season.

For 2008 Hawk Kawasaki offered Haydon a season contract. However two weeks before the start of the race season they were forced to pull out when one of their main sponsors withdrew. So he was once again without a ride.

But he was quickly contacted by Eurosport and decided he would leave racing and go and work for them instead. He has never raced at the top level since.

Says James "After a long career my time had come to retire from racing bikes. It was a difficult choice for sure as there is never a 'right' time as such. You normally find riders only retire after really bad injuries and I've been very fortunate to avoid those. Amazing really and I'm thankful for that. Especially as I have been racing bikes most weekends for 25 years now. From a small kid on a dirt field all the way to the best circuits in the world in front of millions of people. I've had an amazing time too! I've travelled the world and spanned some really cool era's in bikes. From 165 Bhp 500cc V4 2 Strokes to 240 Bhp 1000cc 4 strokes. I've raced them all. From the likes of Schwantz, Doohan, Criville, Cadalora up to Bayliss, Biaggi and Rossi. Wish I had beaten a few more of them mind you! But seriously, I feel blessed to have done something I really loved and been paid well for it. Thank you everyone! Now however, it's time for the next chapter of my life. I can't wait for the challenge!"

James now presents for British Eurosport, mainly on the British Superbike Championship. He is also a regular studio guest on the live World Superbike Championship rounds. For the first time in 3 years James got back on a modern bike at the 2010 British Superbike Championship round at Brands Hatch, James joined the select few and rode some fast demo laps on the 2010 Rizla Suzuki Moto GP bike.

Personal life
James' parents David and Beverley are both retired and live close by. His Dad still owns and rides many motorcycles. James also has three sisters Annabelle, Susannah and Charlotte. James is married to Jo and they have three children, Zac, Maya and Lexi, and the couple lived in Andorra for many years but now reside back in England close to their families. In parallel with his sports commentary career, James has spent the last 10 years focusing on his passion for building and creating genuinely exceptional family homes. James is the nephew of designer Zandra Rhodes.

Former BSB and WSB Champion Neil Hodgson said of James "For sure he was one of the fastest riders I've ever seen who never managed to win a British or World Championship. But he has his head screwed on and a good view of life, so I am sure he will succeed in whatever he chooses to do now. Go get 'em James".

References and notes

External links

 Jamyes Haydon >> Official website
 James Haydon - Property Development >> Imaginative Homes

1973 births
Living people
People from Amersham
British motorcycle racers
English motorcycle racers
British Superbike Championship riders
Superbike World Championship riders
500cc World Championship riders
MotoGP World Championship riders